Dan Morse (born 1938) is an American bridge player from Houston, Texas.

Bridge accomplishments

Awards

 Herman Trophy (1) 2002

Wins

 North American Bridge Championships (12)
 von Zedtwitz Life Master Pairs (1) 1993 
 Rockwell Mixed Pairs (1) 1964 
 Grand National Teams (1) 1977 
 Jacoby Open Swiss Teams (1) 2011 
 Truscott Senior Swiss Teams (1) 2013 
 Vanderbilt (2) 1990, 1993 
 Senior Knockout Teams (3) 1994, 2002, 2003 
 Reisinger (1) 2002 
 Spingold (1) 1977

Runners-up

 North American Bridge Championships
 von Zedtwitz Life Master Pairs (1) 1979 
 Blue Ribbon Pairs (1) 1980 
 North American Pairs (1) 1989 
 Jacoby Open Swiss Teams (1) 1991 
 Vanderbilt (1) 1985 
 Senior Knockout Teams (2) 2007, 2010 
 Keohane North American Swiss Teams (2) 1996, 2005 
 Spingold (1) 1967

Notes

External links
 

1938 births
Living people
American contract bridge players
Place of birth missing (living people)
Date of birth missing (living people)
People from Houston